Alireza Haghighi (born 6 May 1988) is an Iranian goalkeeper who plays for the Iranian based team Nassaji.

Club career

Persepolis
Having joined the senior squad of Persepolis at the age of 16, he made his debut in the match against Saipa on 17 October 2006 and saved a very important penalty against the legendary Ali Daei.
Haghighi was playing for Persepolis Youth teams since 2002, after being scouted by coaches of Persepolis Football School in past years.
He started the 2007–08 season with two other goalkeepers already ahead of him in the pecking order at Persepolis (Hassan Roudbarian, Team Melli's number one and Mehdi Vaezi, who has also been invited to the national team, but never capped). During this season, Haghighi did not play at all but extended his contract at the end of the season.

During the 2008–09 season, Haghighi was lucky to play in every game because of injuries to two other goalkeepers which made Haghighi become the first keeper for every game and statistically he was the number one keeper during this season. He trained under legendary Iranian keeper Ahmad Reza Abedzadeh.

In the 2007–08 season, he captained Persepolis for the first time in the 2–1 victory against Saipa, making him the youngest captain of Persepolis in its history.

Rubin Kazan
In December 2011, Russian Premier League side Rubin Kazan sent a transfer request to Persepolis. He officially left Persepolis on 9 January 2012. On 14 January 2012, Haghighi signed a 4-year deal with Rubin Kazan. He signed a contract with the Russian club on 11 January and made his debut three days later in a pre-season friendly match.

Return to Persepolis (loan)
On 18 July 2013, Haghighi returned to Persepolis and signed a six months loan contract with the club. On 23 October 2013, Haghighi played in a 5–1 win over Padideh Shandiz in a Hazfi Cup match, marked his first match for Persepolis after 18 months. He then played another Hazfi Cup match, this time against Alvand Hamedan which he keeping a clean sheet.

His loan contract ended on 3 December 2013.

Sporting Covilhã (loan)
Haghighi was called back to the Rubin Kazan side during the 2014 winter transfer period. In January 2014, Haghighi signed a loan contract with Portuguese Segunda Liga side Sporting Covilhã, on loan from Rubin Kazan. With Haghighi in net, Sporting Covilha avoided relegation. After 14 appearances with the club, Haghighi's loan contract ended and he returned to Rubin.

Penafiel (loan)
On 24 August 2014, Haghighi signed a one-year loan contract with Primeira Liga side Penafiel. They won their first game on 20 September against Vitória with Haghighi keeping a clean sheet in their 2–0 win. On 24 February 2015 Haghighi was named the Primeira Liga Player of the Week for Matchday 22 after his clean sheet in a 1–0 against Vitórial. After his good performances at Penafiel, Sporting Braga became interested in Haghighi.

Return to Rubin Kazan
Haghighi returned to Rubin for the 2015–16 season. He played in a pre-season friendly on 8 July 2015 against Karlsruher SC in a match that finished 2–2. He played his first official game for Rubin on 24 September 2015 in a Russian Cup game against FC SKA-Energiya Khabarovsk which his team lost 0–2.

Marítimo
On 22 January 2016, Haghighi signed a 30-month contract with Marítimo in the Primeira Liga, reuniting with his former coach, Nelo Vingada. Haghighi received his ITC on 27 January 2016 and was cleared to play for the club. Haghighi made his league debut for Marítimo on 14 February 2016 against S.C. Braga. Haghighi kept his first clean–sheet for the club on 28 February 2016 in a 1–0 victory against Académica. Marítimo and Haghighi agreed to terminate his contract on 20 August 2016.

AFC Eskilstuna
On 13 March 2017, he signed a one-year contract with the Swedish club AFC Eskilstuna, competing in the top tier Allsvenskan. However shortly after joining the team he suffered a major injury and was ruled out for several months. Haghighi returned to training in late June 2017. Alireza finally made his debut on 8 July 2017 in a 1–0 loss to Sirius.

Haghighi was named in an Allsvenskan team of the week in August after great performances since his return from injury, and on 19 August 2017 he assisted a goal in his team's 3–1 victory against Malmö.

GIF Sundsvall
On 13 March 2018, he signed a contract with another Swedish club GIF Sundsvall, competing in the top tier Allsvenskan. The duration of his contract was 3 months, until the end of the 2018 FIFA World Cup. He was released from the team on 11 May 2018.

International career

Youth teams
Haghighi led Iran to the finals of West Asian U-15 tournament, held in Qatar in 2002, He was first keeper Iran U17 at 2004 AFC U-17 Championship, also playing all three games for Iran U20 at 2006 AFC Youth Championship. He made three appearances in 2005 Valentin A.Granatkin Memorial – International Youth Tournament for Iran U20.

Olympic team
Haghighi was invited to Iran U23 in Asian Games 2006, although he did not play any match. He did not play in 2008 AFC Men's Pre-Olympic Tournament and Sosha Makani was the first choice. Under Gholam Peyrovani's management of Iran U23, He was invited again; but missed many trainings and friendly matches of Iran U23, including Tehran 6-Team Tournament, South Africa Camp, and friendly match against Poland. Peyrovani did not invite Haghighi for 2010 Guangzhou Asian Games stating "he is too old to play in 2012 London Olympics", despite inviting 28 years old Mehdi Rahmati as a Wild Card player. Peyrovani also rejected having any problems with Haghighi.

Senior team
Haghighi was called up to Iran national football team in 2010 under management of Afshin Ghotbi.
In 2012 Haghighi was called up to the 2012 WAFF Championship in Kuwait. He started in a game against Bahrain. The game ended 0–0.

2014 FIFA World Cup

On 1 June 2014, he was included in Iran's 2014 FIFA World Cup squad by Carlos Queiroz. On 16 June 2014, Haghighi started in Iran's opening match in the World Cup against Nigeria. With a goalless draw, Haghighi became the first Iranian goalkeeper to achieve a clean sheet at a FIFA World Cup. He also started Iran's next two matches in the World Cup against Argentina and Bosnia and Herzegovina. He showed a good performance in the Argentina match where he saved shots from Lionel Messi, Gonzalo Higuaín and Sergio Agüero. He conceded the only goal of the match in the 91st minute when Lionel Messi dribbled inside and curled a left-footed shot past the outstretched hands of Haghighi. In Iran's next and final match of the tournament, Haghighi conceded goals from Bosnia and Herzegovina strikers, where Iran was eliminated from the 2014 FIFA World Cup in the group stages after a 3–1 defeat.

2015 AFC Asian Cup
He was called into Iran's 2015 AFC Asian Cup squad on 30 December 2014 by Carlos Queiroz. Haghighi was one of three goalkeepers that kept a clean sheet throughout the group stages of the 2015 AFC Asian Cup

Club career statistics

Honours
Persepolis
Iran Pro League: 2007–08
Hazfi Cup: 2009–10, 2010–11

Rubin Kazan
Russian Cup: 2011–12
Russian Super Cup: 2012
Marbella Cup: 2012

Nassaji
Hazfi Cup: 2021–22

Iran U23
Asian Games Bronze Medal: 2006

Individual
Primeira Liga Player of the Week: 2014–15
Allsvenskan Player of the Week: 2017

References

External links
 
 
 Iran Pro League Stats
 
 
 Alireza Haghighi at Fotbolltransfers
Alireza Haghighi On Instagram

1988 births
Living people
People from Tehran
Iranian footballers
Association football goalkeepers
Asian Games bronze medalists for Iran
Persepolis F.C. players
FC Rubin Kazan players
S.C. Covilhã players
F.C. Penafiel players
Persian Gulf Pro League players
Primeira Liga players
Liga Portugal 2 players
Allsvenskan players
Iranian expatriate footballers
Iranian expatriate sportspeople in Sweden
Iran international footballers
Iran under-20 international footballers
Iran youth international footballers
Iranian expatriate sportspeople in Russia
Expatriate footballers in Russia
Iranian expatriate sportspeople in Portugal
Expatriate footballers in Portugal
2014 FIFA World Cup players
2015 AFC Asian Cup players
Asian Games medalists in football
Footballers at the 2006 Asian Games
Medalists at the 2006 Asian Games
Nassaji Mazandaran players
21st-century Iranian people